Callum Lancaster (born 13 October 1996) was a professional rugby league footballer who played for Hull F.C. in the Super League.

Career
Lancaster made his Hull début on 23 May 2014 in a Super League away match against Leeds.

References

External links
 (archived by web.archive.org) Hull profile

Living people
Hull F.C. players
1996 births
Rugby league wingers